The Yellowknife Catholic School Board is the school board responsible for École St. Joseph School, Weledeh Catholic School, École St. Patrick High School and the Kimberlite Career & Technical Centre in Yellowknife, Northwest Territories, Canada.

See also
 List of schools in the Northwest Territories
 Education in Canada

Mapping

École St. Joseph School, 
Weledeh Catholic School, 
St. Patrick High School, 
Kimberlite Career & Technical Centre, 
Yellowknife Catholic School Board,

References

External links
Yellowknife Catholic School Board website

School districts in the Northwest Territories
Education in Yellowknife